The Hindu Temple of Atlanta is located in Riverdale, Georgia and serves the Metro Atlanta Hindu population. But, because of its proximity to the I-75, and its popularity, nearly 5-10% of the devotees are from the eastern seaboard, southern, and midwestern states. The temple is 9-miles away from the Hartsfield-Jackson International Airport terminal. 
It has been rated as one of the top 10 Hindu temples in the US.

History
The temple was established on October 19th 1984 and closely conforms to temple architecture from the Pandya Empire.

Design
The Hindu temple has two complexes – the older and larger shrine for Lord Venkateswara as the presiding deity,  and the newer one consecrated in 2007, with Lord Shiva as the presiding deity Because the Shiva temple here, is adjunct, to the Venkateshwara temple, Lord Shiva is known as Ramalingeshwara. In addition to the presiding deity, both complexes have shrines for other deities such as Padmavathi, Hanuman, Ganesha, Kala Bhairava, Navagragha etc.

References

External links

 
 Facebook page

Hindu temples in Georgia (U.S. state)
Buildings and structures in Clayton County, Georgia
Hinduism in the United States
Religious buildings and structures completed in 1990
1990 establishments in Georgia (U.S. state)
Religious organizations established in 1990
Asian-American culture in Georgia (U.S. state)
Indian-American culture in Georgia (U.S. state)
Religious buildings and structures in Clayton County, Georgia